The finals competition of the women's 10 metre platform synchronized was held on June 4, the third day of the 2010 FINA Diving World Cup.

Results

Green denotes finalists

References

2010 FINA Diving World Cup